Armstrong Hall (1853-1921) was Archdeacon of Richmond from 1908 until his death.

Armstrong was born at Parkhurst, Isle of Wight and educated at Christ's Hospital and King's College London. After a curacy at  Lee in South-east London he held incumbencies in the Isle of Man, Bristol, Swindon, Isleworth, Perth, NB and Methley.

During World War I he was a Chaplain to the Forces and Deputy Assistant Chaplain General (Northern Command). Later he was an Honorary Chaplain to the King.

References

1853 births
Archdeacons of Richmond
1921 deaths
Alumni of King's College London
People educated at Christ's Hospital
Clergy from the Isle of Wight
Honorary Chaplains to the King
Royal Army Chaplains' Department officers